Prabha Misra is an Indian politician.

Early life 
Prabha Misra was born in Shahbad Hardoi in Tripathi family.  Like  most girls at that time was married at an early age of about 13 years to Sukh Deo Prasad Misra son of Pandit Hazari Lal Mishra a railway Clark working in Ajmer.

Education 

Prabha has double MA from Agra University and LLB from Government college Ajmer.

Married life 

She was a bright student and had interest in accruing knowledge. Her father-in-law supported her to continue her education. In her times she was one of a few girls pursuing education. Prabha and Sukh Deo had five children.

Political career 

She contested Assembly election from Pushkar Assembly constituency which belongs to the State Rajasthan and was a member of assembly (MLA) from 1957 to 1977. She won the assembly elections in 1957, 1962, 1967 and 1972 elections. She represented Indian National Congress. In her lifetime she held various cabinet posts.

References

Year of birth missing
Possibly living people
Rajasthan MLAs 1957–1962
Rajasthan MLAs 1962–1967
Rajasthan MLAs 1967–1972
Rajasthan MLAs 1972–1977
Women members of the Rajasthan Legislative Assembly
Dr. Bhimrao Ambedkar University alumni
20th-century Indian women
20th-century Indian people